Shaun Bowler (born June 21, 1958) is Distinguished Professor & Dean of the Graduate Division in the Department of Political Science at the University of California, Riverside.

References

External links
Faculty profile

1958 births
Living people
American political scientists
University of California, Riverside faculty
Washington University in St. Louis alumni
Political science journal editors